Springwood High School may refer to:

Springwood High School, King's Lynn, in Norfolk, England
Springwood High School (Alabama), in Lanett, Alabama
Springwood High School (New South Wales), in City of Blue Mountains, New South Wales
Springwood State High School, in Springwood, Queensland